"Zero (From the Original Motion Picture "Ralph Breaks the Internet")", or simply "Zero", is a song by American pop rock band Imagine Dragons, who co-wrote it with their producer John Hill. It is the second single from the band's fourth studio album Origins. The song is featured in the Disney animated film Ralph Breaks the Internet and was included in its second official trailer and its soundtrack.

Background
Dan Reynolds, the band's frontman, said that "[the] song speaks to" the title character's struggle for self-acceptance, which the band resonated with, while the film's co-director, Rich Moore, called the song "a bold choice for an end-credit song because it's about someone who feels like a zero, someone who hasn't always felt worthy, someone who's allowed his entire sense of self to rely on a single friendship". Phil Johnston, the film's co-writer and co-director, said that Ralph's insecurity is a feeling everyone can relate to, "but the song tells us we’re not alone. They nailed the theme of the movie in a way that also makes you want to dance."

Critical reception
Markos Papadatos of Digital Journal stated that the song is "worth more than just a passing glance, and it garners two thumbs up."

Music video
A music video for the song was released on October 23, 2018. The video takes place in an arcade, and promotes the Disney animated film Ralph Breaks the Internet. It has received over 86 million views as of March 2023.

Live performances
"Zero" was performed live for the first time at the iHeartRadio Music Festival on September 22, 2018, along with another song from the album: "Natural". "Zero" was also performed at Jimmy Kimmel Live! on November 5, 2018. "Zero" was also performed live at the Cosmopolitan in Las Vegas on November 7, along with three other songs from the album: "Natural", "Machine" and "Bad Liar".

Charts

Weekly charts

Year-end charts

Certification

Release history

References

2010s ballads
2018 songs
2018 singles
Imagine Dragons songs
Disney songs
Song recordings produced by John Hill (record producer)
Songs written for animated films
Songs written by Dan Reynolds (musician)
Songs written by Ben McKee
Songs written by Wayne Sermon
Songs written by Daniel Platzman
Songs written by John Hill (record producer)
Songs written for films
Kidinakorner singles
Walt Disney Records singles
Interscope Records singles
Wreck-It Ralph